The Death of a Lumberjack is a 1973 Canadian drama film directed by Gilles Carle. The film was entered into the 1973 Cannes Film Festival.

Plot
A young woman (Carole Laure) from rural Quebec comes to Montreal to find out the whereabouts of her father. She takes a job as a topless cowgirl singer in a nightclub owned by Armand (Willie Lamothe). Through her father's mistress, Blanche (Denise Filiatrault), she discovers he was working in a lumberjack camp and travels with Armand and Blanche to find him; however, it turns out he has been murdered by the camp's owners.

Reception
The Death of a Lumberjack is one of Carle's best-known films in Quebec, although it's virtually unknown in the rest of Canada. The film was seen by 188,372 people in France. It won Canadian Film Awards for Supporting Actor (Lamothe) and Musical Score.

Cast

References

Works cited

External links

1973 films
1973 drama films
Canadian drama films
1970s French-language films
Films directed by Gilles Carle
Films set in Montreal
French-language Canadian films
1970s Canadian films